These are the official results of the men's 10,000 metres event at the 1980 Summer Olympics in Moscow, Soviet Union. There were a total number of 40 participating athletes, with the final held on Sunday July 27, 1980.

Medalists

Records
These were the standing world and Olympic records (in minutes) prior to the 1980 Summer Olympics.

Results

Final

Qualifying Heats
Held on Thursday 24 July 1980

See also
 1976 Men's Olympic Games 10000 metres (Montreal)
 1978 Men's European Championships 10000 metres (Prague)
 1982 Men's European Championships 10000 metres (Athens)
 1983 Men's World Championships 10000 metres (Helsinki)
 1984 Men's Olympic Games 10000 metres (Los Angeles)
 1986 Men's European Championships 10000 metres (Stuttgart)
 1987 Men's World Championships 10000 metres (Rome)

References

External links
 Results

 1
10,000 metres at the Olympics
Men's events at the 1980 Summer Olympics